The Kalalau Valley is located on the northwest side of the island of Kauai in the state of Hawaii.  The valley is located in the Nā Pali Coast State Park and houses the Kalalau Beach.  The Nā Pali Coast is rugged and is inaccessible to automobiles.  The only legal ways to access the valley are by kayak or by hiking the Kalalau Trail.

The abundant sun and rain provides an ideal environment for flora and fauna. Many native Hawaiians lived in the valley into the 20th century, farming taro from a vast complex of terraced fields. Today, its designation as a state park forbids anyone from residing there.

Access to Kalalau Valley

Since the Nā Pali Coast is too steep for any motorized vehicles, all access to the valley is by boat or foot, except for emergency helicopter landings. Kayaks are a popular way of visiting the valley, although sea conditions can make this dangerous during the winter.

Access to the Kalalau Valley is controlled.  A limited number of permits are sold for camping in Kalalau Valley every year by the Hawai'i Department of Land and Natural Resources (DLNR), although parking for campers is no longer allowed at the trail head. Instead, parking is now an exclusive privilege for day users of Ha'ena State Park, where the Kalalau trail head is located, and permitted Kalalau campers are provided no overnight parking whatsoever. Anyone wishing to hike or run beyond Hanakāpīai valley must have a permit for staying in Kalalau Valley overnight, even if their intention is to return the same day. A total of sixty overnight permits are issued for each night. Permits must generally be sought as early as 6 months in advance of travel.

Ecology
The valley is home to many rare species, including the endangered plant Dubautia kalalauensis which was named for the valley and is found nowhere else in the world. Other endemics include the endangered Schiedea attenuata., and previously unknown plant species have been discovered there

Life in Kalalau Valley

The natural environment and relative isolation, despite the noise of constant helicopter traffic, are the major attractions of the valley. There is a small waterfall in this area that is used for bathing and washing dishes.

At one end of the beach is a stream that is also used for fresh water. All the streams are susceptible to contamination with leptospirosis, a bacterium that is transmitted from the urine of infected rodents.

Squatters
In spite of the efforts of the state of Hawaii, some people illegally hike the Kalalau Trail and camp and even live in the valley. Visitors who do not have a permit are occasionally issued citations that require a court appearance and a fine of up to $500 for a first offense.

On April 28, 2017, Cody Safadago, a man alleged to be living in Kalalau, was charged with stealing a truck and causing an accident that killed a Kauai woman the previous day, while he was driving drunk. This incident seemed to have increased awareness of illegal activity in Kalalau Valley, and may have helped lead to a May 2017 crackdown on illegal campers in Kalalau by officers of the Department of Land and Natural resources (DLNR). Some Hawaii residents have posted online complaints about illegal campers in Kalalau, referencing videos posted online by some of those same campers. While some videos appear to have been removed, the anger among locals continues. Some feel contempt for what they call "hippies" and "squatters" who violate State law by camping without required permits - sometimes for months or longer - in the Na Pali Coast State Wilderness Park, where Kalalau Valley is located. Some Kauai residents decry the camping by people they consider to be disrespectful of the land, citing reports of accumulating trash in the camps, and disrespect of the citizenry of Kauai through various illegal conduct of the illegal campers.

Destruction of terraced gardens
The terraced gardens in the Kalalau Valley are threatened by the introduced, invasive trees which create underground root networks invading the rock walls.  The trees then fall and topple the rock walls causing permanent damage. The origin of the trees is disputed.

Management of Kalalau Valley
The valley is a part of the Nā Pali Coast State Park and the DLNR is responsible for its maintenance and preservation.

References

External links 
Camping permits

Valleys of Kauai